Zürich or Zurich is the largest city in Switzerland.

Zurich or Zürich may also refer to:

Places

Switzerland
Canton of Zürich, Swiss canton of which the city is the capital
Zürich District
Zurich Airport
Lake Zurich, lake in Switzerland

United States
Zurich, California
Zurich, Kansas
Zurich, Montana
Zurich, New York, in Wayne County
Lake Zurich, Illinois, town in Illinois

Other
Zurich, Ontario, Canada
Zurich, Friesland, Netherlands

Organisations
University of Zurich
ETH Zurich, Swiss Federal Institute of Technology in Zurich
Zurich Insurance Group, an insurance and risk management company
FC Zürich, football (soccer) club
Grasshopper Club Zürich, football (soccer) club

Other uses
Battle of Zürich (disambiguation), several battles
13025 Zürich, an asteroid
Zürich ware, porcelain
Zurich (film), a 2013 German film
Zurich (Borbetomagus album), a 1984 live album by Borbetomagus
Zurich (The White Foliage album)
Zurich, a 2005 live album by Praxis

See also
Stadion Zürich, multi-sport stadium
Weltklasse Zürich, Golden League athletics meeting
Zürich Bible, a bible translation historically based on the translation by Ulrich Zwingli
Zurich 4 and 6, first postage stamp issued in mainland Europe
Zürich German, dialect of German spoken in the Swiss canton
Zürich model, of public transport, based on that of the city
Zurich number, or Wolf number, a measure of sunspot activity
Zurich Open, WTA Tour tennis tournament

pt:Zurich